The Island of the Mapmaker's Wife is a 2001 British-Dutch film directed by Michie Gleason, with a screenplay by Michie Gleason based on a short story by Marilyn Sides which  appeared in the 1990 O. Henry Prize Stories collection.

Plot
Descotes, a young map expert, discovers the marvelous erotic secret of an elaborate ancient map that she lusts to own.

External links 
 

2001 films
2001 drama films
2000s English-language films